Brutus of Alba may refer to:

 An alternative name for the legendary figure Brutus of Troy
 Brutus of Alba (play), a 1678 play by the Irish writer Nahum Tate
 Brutus of Alba (opera), a 1696 semi-opera by Daniel Purcell to a libretto by George Powell